Jedh Colby Barker (June 20, 1945 – September 21, 1967) was a United States Marine Corps Lance Corporal who posthumously received the Medal of Honor for heroism during the Vietnam War in September 1967.

While participating in Operation Kingfisher, Barker's platoon was attacked by North Vietnamese forces in the western part of the Leatherneck Square. The platoon got into cover, and Barker lay down suppressing fire on the Vietnamese positions. When a grenade was thrown into the American defensive position, Barker jumped onto it and saved the lives of fellow injured Marines.

Biography
Jedh Barker was born on June 20, 1945, in Franklin, New Hampshire. At the age of six, he moved with his parents to Park Ridge, New Jersey, where he graduated from grammar school in 1960, and from Park Ridge High School in 1964, where he was captain of the football and baseball teams. He attended Fairleigh Dickinson University, Rutherford, New Jersey, and then Northeast Missouri State Teachers College in Kirksville, Missouri until May 1966. While at Northeast, he was a member of the Bulldogs football team.

On June 20, 1966, he enlisted in the U.S. Marine Corps Reserve. He was a member of the Special Volunteer Reserve, 1st Marine Corps District, New York, New York, until discharged to enlist in the regular Marine Corps on October 5, 1966.

After completion of recruit training at the Marine Corps Recruit Depot Parris Island, South Carolina, in December 1966, he underwent individual combat training and weapons special training with the 2nd Infantry Training Battalion, 1st Infantry Training Regiment, Marine Corps Base, Camp Lejeune, North Carolina. He was promoted to private first class, December 1, 1966, while undergoing individual combat training.

In March 1967, PFC Barker joined Marine Air Base Squadron 21, Marine Aircraft Group 12, 1st Marine Aircraft Wing, San Francisco, California, and served as group guard until the following June when he was reassigned to Fox Company, 2nd Battalion, 4th Marines, 3rd Marine Division, in the Republic of Vietnam. He was promoted to Lance Corporal on September 1, 1967. On the morning of September 21, 1967, during Operation Kingfisher southeast of Con Thien near Phu Oc, the Battalion was ambushed by the 90th regiment of the 324B Division. Lance Corporal Barker was killed in action during this engagement.

The Medal of Honor was presented to Barker's family by Vice President Spiro Agnew in ceremonies held on October 31, 1969.

Lance Corporal Barker was buried at the George Washington Memorial Park in Paramus, New Jersey.

Decorations
Barker's medals and decorations include: the Medal of Honor, the Purple Heart, the Presidential Unit Citation, the National Defense Service Medal, the Vietnam Service Medal with one bronze star, and the Republic of Vietnam Campaign Medal.

Medal of Honor citation
The President of the United States in the name of the Congress takes pride in presenting the MEDAL OF HONOR posthumously to

for service as set forth in the following CITATION:
For conspicuous gallantry and intrepidity at the risk of his life above and beyond the call of duty while serving as a machine gunner with Company F, Second Battalion, Fourth Marines, Third Marine Division, in the Republic of Vietnam on 21 September 1967. During a reconnaissance operation near Con Thien, Corporal Barker's squad was suddenly hit by enemy sniper fire. The squad immediately deployed to a combat formation and advanced to a strongly fortified enemy position, when it was again struck by small arms and automatic weapons fire, sustaining numerous casualties. Although wounded by the initial burst of fire, Corporal Barker boldly remained in the open, delivering a devastating volume of accurate fire on the numerically superior force. The enemy was intent upon annihilating the small Marine force and, realizing that Corporal Barker was a threat to their position, directed the preponderance of their fire on his position. He was again wounded, this time in the right hand, which prevented him from operating his vitally needed machine gun. Suddenly, and without warning, an enemy grenade landed in the midst of the few surviving Marines. Unhesitatingly and with complete disregard for his own personal safety, Corporal Barker threw himself upon the deadly grenade, absorbing with his own body the full and tremendous force of the explosion. In a final act of bravery, he crawled to the side of a wounded comrade and administered first aid before succumbing to his grievous wounds. His bold initiative, intrepid fighting spirit, and unwavering devotion to duty in the face of almost certain death undoubtedly saved his comrades from further injury or possible death and reflected great credit upon himself, the Marine Corps, and the United States Naval Service. He gallantly gave his life for his country.
/S/RICHARD M. NIXON

In memory
Lance Corporal Jedh Colby Barker has his name engraved on the Vietnam Veterans Memorial on Panel 26E Line 099.

See also

List of Medal of Honor recipients
List of Medal of Honor recipients for the Vietnam War

Notes

References

External links

1945 births
1967 deaths
Fairleigh Dickinson University alumni
United States Marine Corps Medal of Honor recipients
Park Ridge High School alumni
People from Park Ridge, New Jersey
United States Marines
American military personnel killed in the Vietnam War
People from Franklin, New Hampshire
Vietnam War recipients of the Medal of Honor
Burials at George Washington Memorial Park (Paramus, New Jersey)
Deaths by hand grenade
Military personnel from New Jersey
Military personnel from New Hampshire
United States Marine Corps personnel of the Vietnam War
United States Marine Corps reservists